Renan Henrique Oliveira Vieira (born December 29, 1989 in Itabira), or simply Renan Oliveira, is a Brazilian footballer who plays for Remo, as an attacking midfielder.

He made his professional debut in a 2–3 home defeat to Guarani-MG on April 6, 2008 in the Minas Gerais State Championship. He scored his 1st professional goal in a 3–2 home win over Tupi on April 13, 2008 in the same competition.

Honours
Goiás
Campeonato Brasileiro Série B: 2012
Campeonato Goiano: 2013

América Mineiro
Campeonato Brasileiro Série B: 2017

Sūduva
 A Lyga: 2019
 Lithuanian Football Cup: 2019

References

External links
 
atletico.com.br 

1989 births
Living people
Brazilian footballers
Campeonato Brasileiro Série A players
Campeonato Brasileiro Série B players
Clube Atlético Mineiro players
Esporte Clube Vitória players
Coritiba Foot Ball Club players
Goiás Esporte Clube players
Sport Club do Recife players
América Futebol Clube (MG) players
Avaí FC players
Brazil youth international footballers
Association football midfielders